Laura Shepherd may refer to:

Laura Shepherd, character in Goodbye World
Laura Shepherd (filmmaker), director of Tales from the Cryptkeeper